Tag til Rønneby Kro is a 1941 Danish family film directed by Jon Iversen and Alice O'Fredericks.

Cast
Johannes Meyer as Kroejer Bartholdi
Bodil Kjer as Anne Lise
Ib Schønberg as Tjener Sørensen
Poul Reichhardt as Journalist Daniel Jensen
Petrine Sonne as Daniels tante
Henry Nielsen as Landbetjent Mortensen
Sigrid Horne-Rasmussen as Journalisten Molly
Sigurd Langberg as Bankdirektøren Julius
Svend Bille as Ministeren
Knud Heglund as Professoren
Lau Lauritzen as Sagføreren
Valdemar Møller as Smukke Peter
Jeanne Darville

References

External links

1941 films
1941 drama films
Danish black-and-white films
Films directed by Alice O'Fredericks
Films directed by Jon Iversen
Danish drama films
1940s Danish-language films